Kate (Katie) McVicar (1856–1886), was a Canadian trade unionist and shoe worker. She organized the first trade union for women workers in Canada under the guidance of the Knights of Labor.

References 

Canadian trade unionists
1856 births
1886 deaths
19th-century Canadian women
Canadian women trade unionists
Knights of Labor people
Shoemakers